Boreotropical flora were plants that may have formed a belt of vegetation around the Northern Hemisphere during the Eocene epoch.  These included forests composed of large, fast-growing trees (such as dawn redwoods) as far north as 80°N.

See also
 Paleocene-Eocene Thermal Maximum

References
 Fossil Forests and Palaeoecology of the Cretaceous and Tertiary

 
Phytogeography
Eocene plants